Yussif Daouda Moussa (born 4 September 1998) is a professional footballer who plays as a midfielder for Finnish club Ilves. Born in Ghana, he represents the Niger national football team.

Club career
On 9 December 2021, he agreed to return to Ilves in Finland on a one-year contract.

International career
Born and raised in Ghana, Moussa was discovered by Nigerien scouts and moved to the country to find more opportunities. Naturalized as a Nigerien, he represented Niger youth national teams before debuting with the senior Niger national team in 2017.

Career statistics

Club

Notes

International

International goals
Scores and results Niger's  goal tally first.

References

1998 births
Living people
People from Greater Accra Region
Nigerien footballers
Niger international footballers
Ghanaian footballers
Nigerien people of Ghanaian descent
Ghanaian emigrants to Niger
Association football midfielders
FC Ilves players
Bnei Yehuda Tel Aviv F.C. players
Veikkausliiga players
Israeli Premier League players
Expatriate footballers in Finland
Expatriate footballers in Israel
Nigerien expatriate footballers
Ghanaian expatriate footballers
Nigerien expatriate sportspeople in Israel